Stanisław Tarnowski ; known as  Stanisław Tarnowski „Biały” ; May 8, 1838 – July 2, 1909) was a Polish painter known for landscapes and better as friend of Artur Grottger and model to his paintings. Collector of art.

Youth 
Stanisław Tarnowski was a son of Walerian Tarnowskiego and Ernestyna, brother of Władysław Tarnowski m.in., and cousin of Stanisław Tarnowski, called in youth „Czarny” („Black”), later the Rector of Jagellonian University. When Stanisław „Biały” („White”) was called from colour of hair. Initially, he learnt with Jesuit College in Lvov together with brother; then, in Cracow under direction of Szymon Dutkiewicz; his father's relative Father Jan Scipio del Campo, and Wincenty Pol, in free moments he wandered through the neighbourhoods of Cracow and Tatras. Later, he studied in Cracow until the father's death and inheriting earthly estate, which he administered. He learnt drawing and painting with Jan Kanty Maszkowski (together with Artur Grottger), in Cracow with painter of architecture Maksymilian Cercha and landscapist Leon Dembowski. In 1856 and 1857 he had larger exhibitions in Cracow.  Stanisław Tarnowski's paintings were to 1938 r. in possession his relatives, mainly in Śniatynka. After World War II Stanisław's paintings are in Polish museums, especially in National Museum in Cracow. In 1863, Stanisław fought in January Insurrection, among others in Battle of Radziwiłłów. After Insurrection, he more seldom depicted, but he stayed sensitive on beauty and became art collector.

Friendship and posing for paintings 
Since early childhood Stanisław was friends with Artur Grottger, which later was frequent guest in Śniatynka. And many times Stanisław posed for his paintings.

Political career 
Stanisław Tarnowski was a member of parliament of Galicia and Lodomeria in 1883–95.

Bibliography

Bibliography in German 
 Z. Batowski „Tarnowski, Stanislaw” in: „Allgemeines Lexikon der Bildenden Künstler von der antike bis zur gegenwart”, Begründet von Ulrich Triemi und Felix Becker unter mitwirkung von etwa 400 fachgelehrten bearbeitet und redigiert von H.. Vollmer, B. C. Kreplin, H. Wolff, O. Kellner; edited by Hans Vollmer, Vol. 32 (Stephens – Theodotos), publ. Von E. A. Seemann, Leipzig, 1938, .
 Saur „Allgemeines Künstlerlexikon Bio-bibliographischer Index A-Z”, Vol. 9 (Schinz-Toricelli), Munich-Leipzig, 2000, .
 Jan Bołoz Antoniewicz „Katalog der retrospectiven Ausstellung polnischer Kunst 1764-1886”), Dyrekcyia Powszechnej Wystawy Krajowej, Lvov, 1894, position 1416.
 Jan Bołoz Antoniewicz „Kat. Wyst. szt. pol. 1764-1886” (auch dtsche Ausg.); ders., Grottger, Lemberg u. Warschau [1910].

Bibliography in Polish 
 Emmanuel Świeykowski „Pamiętnik Towarzystwa Przyjaciół Sztuk Pięknych w Krakowie. 1854-1904 pięćdziesiąt lat działalności dla sztuki ojczystej.”, (second edition), Towarzystwo Przyjaciół Sztuk Pięknych w Krakowie, Cracow, 1905, p. 539 and 164.
 Przegląd polski (Cracow), 173 (1909) 278f. (Obituary). 
 Arthur i Wanda. „Listy-Pamiętniki”, Vol. 1, p. 162 (ill.); 2, Medyka u. Lvov, 1928.

References

External links

 Genealogy of the Tarnowski Family - a page dedicated to Stanisław Tarnowski and his family; and Stanisław Tarnowski's biographical note in Genealogy of the Tarnowski Family.
 Stanisław Tarnowski of Śniatynka in: Marek Jerzy Minakowski „Genealogia potomków Sejmu Wielkiego”.
 Siedziba Stanisława Tarnowskiego w Śniatynce, stan w roku 2006: front-elevation i garden-elevation.
 Władysław Tarnowski Do S... T... in Wikiźródła

1838 births
1893 deaths
19th-century Polish painters
19th-century Polish male artists
Stanisław
Polish male painters